There are about 35 known moths of Eswatini. The moths (mostly nocturnal) and butterflies (mostly diurnal) together make up the taxonomic order Lepidoptera.

This is a list of moth species which have been recorded in Eswatini (formerly Swaziland).

Arctiidae
Amerila mulleri Häuser & Boppré, 1997
Lepista aposema Kühne, 2010

Crambidae
Pyrausta apicalis (Hampson, 1913)

Geometridae
Drepanogynis admiranda (Warren, 1905)
Drepanogynis arcuifera Prout, 1934
Drepanogynis cambogiaria (Guenée, 1858)
Drepanogynis chromatina (Prout, 1913)
Drepanogynis costipicta (Prout, 1932)
Drepanogynis determinata (Walker, 1860)
Drepanogynis devia (Prout, 1913)
Drepanogynis gloriola (Prout, 1913)
Drepanogynis hypenissa (Butler, 1875)
Drepanogynis latipennis Krüger, 2002
Drepanogynis leptodoma Prout, 1917
Drepanogynis mixtaria Guenée, 1858
Drepanogynis olivescens (Warren, 1898)
Drepanogynis punctata (Warren, 1897)
Drepanogynis subrosea Krüger, 2002
Drepanogynis variciliata Krüger, 2002

Gracillariidae
Phyllocnistis citrella Stainton, 1856

Lasiocampidae
Bombycomorpha bifascia (Walker, 1855)

Lasiocampidae
Braura ligniclusa (Walker, 1865)
Eutricha morosa (Walker, 1865)

Notodontidae
Antheua ornata (Walker, 1865)

Pterophoridae
Exelastis atomosa (Walsingham, 1885)
Hepalastis pumilio (Zeller, 1873)
Lantanophaga pusillidactylus (Walker, 1864)
Megalorhipida leucodactylus (Fabricius, 1794)
Sphenarches anisodactylus (Walker, 1864)
Stenodacma wahlbergi (Zeller, 1852)

Saturniidae
Gonimbrasia wahlbergii (Boisduval, 1847)

Sphingidae
Oligographa juniperi (Boisduval, 1847)

Tortricidae
Clepsis gnathocera Razowski, 2006
Megalota lobotona (Meyrick, 1921)
Metendothenia balanacma (Meyrick, 1914)
Orilesa olearis (Meyrick, 1912)

References

External links 
 Afromoths

Moths
Moths
Eswatini
Eswatini